Copyright is the right to copy and publish a particular work. The terms "copy" and "publish" are quite broad. They include copying in electronic form, the making of translated versions, the creation of a television program based on the work, and putting the work on the Internet. A work is protected by copyright if it is a literary or artistic work. This general expression covers almost all products of creative and original effort. Copyright protects only the specific expression of an idea, not the idea itself. A collection of facts may be copyrighted if there was creative activity involved in compiling the collection. Several countries provide separate protection for collections of facts that qualify as "databases", but that provision is not considered copyright. Copyright protection is automatic upon creation of the work. In some countries, registration with a copyright office has additional benefits, such as the ability to sue, or to receive more money in damages. When a work's copyright term ends, the work passes into the public domain.

Berne Convention

The Berne Convention stipulates that the duration of the term for copyright protection is the life of the author plus at least 50 years after their death. For some categories of works, the minimum duration is shorter: for example, the minimum term for applied art is 25 years, movies have a minimum term of 50 years. Most countries have opted for a longer term of protection, as permitted.

Under the Convention, the duration of copyright depends on the length of the author's life. Berne specifies that copyright exists a minimum of 50 years after the author's death, while a number of countries, including the European Union and the United States, have extended that to 70 years after the author's death. A small number of countries have extended copyright even further, with Mexico having the lengthiest term at 100 years after the author's death.

United States
In 1989, the Berne Convention became effective in the U.S. Since that date, U.S. authors obtain copyright on their works automatically, with registration no longer required. However, many U.S. texts on copyright have not been updated and still echo the old registration principle.

Copyright registration remains available in the U.S. To initiate a lawsuit against an infringer, registration is still required. Registration offers the potential of statutory damages from the infringer, rather than only actual damages.

European Union
All countries within the European Union are signatory states of the Berne Convention. Additionally, Copyright in the European Union is regulated through European Directives.

The member states of the European Union have, following a directive, increased the term to life of the author plus 70 years after their death. Although this was not the original intention, the extension applies retroactively; this had the effect that works that had ended up in the public domain because the author was dead for 50 years, received an additional twenty years of protection.

European countries follow the principle that copyright protection is granted automatically upon creation of the work. This principle was first established in the Berne Convention (1886), and Article 5 of the Convention expressly forbids any member country to require formal action for copyright protection.

Copyright duration by country
Countries and respective copyright terms, with length of standard copyright in years are listed. Entries for non-country entities are included: the European Union, Berne Convention, and the Universal Copyright Convention, which set minimum terms for their member states or signatories. The Agreement on Trade Related Aspects of Intellectual Property Rights (TRIPS), though not included, requires a copyright length of at least 50 years after death.

Legend
 0, no copyright = Not copyrighted
 Life + xx years = Copyrighted for authors' lifetime plus xx years after their deaths
 xx years after publication, creation, etc. = copyrighted for xx years since publication, creation, etc., of works
 Until year end = Copyrighted until the end of a calendar year, i.e. 31 December, unless otherwise specified
 Berne = Country has signed the Berne Convention, see Berne in the "Countries, ..." column
 TRIPS = The Agreement on Trade Related Aspects of Intellectual Property Rights (TRIPS) is an international agreement administered by the World Trade Organization (WTO) that sets down minimum standards for many forms of intellectual property (IP) regulation as applied to nationals of other WTO Members. This also indicates that this country has at least a minimum of 50 years after the death of the creator until the copyright expires.
 WCT = The World Intellectual Property Organization Copyright Treaty, (WIPO Copyright Treaty or WCT), is an international treaty on copyright law adopted by the member states of the World Intellectual Property Organization (WIPO) in 1996.

Table of copyright duration by country

See also
CERLALC, an intergovernmental organization that promotes the development of book publishing and copyright issues in Latin America and the Caribbean
List of parties to international copyright treaties
Moral rights (copyright law)
Official text copyright
Rule of the shorter term

Notes

References

External links
 Summary of copyright terms in various countries, with links to summaries or copies of national laws
 UNESCO Collection of National Copyright Laws with links to the official documentation for most listed countries
 The duration of copyright in various countries

 
Length
Copyright length
 
Copyright length